Operation MB8 was a British Royal Navy operation in the Mediterranean Sea from 4 to 11 November 1940. It was made up of six forces comprising two aircraft carriers, five battleships, 10 cruisers and 30 destroyers, including much of Force H from Gibraltar, protecting four supply convoys.

It consisted of Operation Coat, Operation Crack, Convoy MW 3, Convoy ME 3, Convoy AN 6 and the main element, Battle of Taranto (Operation Judgement).

Operation Coat
Operation Coat was a reinforcement convoy from Britain to Malta, carrying troops and anti-aircraft guns. It was covered by the aircraft carrier , light cruiser  and three more destroyers, all from Force H, out to mid-Mediterranean; three Force H destroyers would remain, the rest turning back  from Sicily.

Convoy MW 3
Convoy MW 3 was made up of three empty merchantmen bound for Malta from Alexandria, plus an Australian destroyer and the monitor  bound for the base at Suda Bay in Crete. The convoy was escorted by the anti-aircraft cruiser , accompanied by three destroyers. The  convoy left Alexandria on 4 November and reached Malta on 10 November.

Convoy ME 3
Convoy ME 3 comprised four merchantmen sailing in ballast from Malta to Alexandria, under escort of the battleship , Coventry, and two destroyers. The convoy sailed from Malta on 10 November and arrived in Alexandria on 13 November.

Convoy AN 6
Convoy AN 6 consisted of four slow tankers bound for Greece from Egypt, in support of the British expedition there, escorted by a slow trawler.

All three would rejoin to form Force X for an 11/12 November raid on the Otranto Strait.

Operation Crack
Operation Crack was an attack on Cagliari by aircraft from Ark Royal, en route to Malta, branching off from Operation Coat.

Operation Judgement

A rendezvous with the Barham group from Operation Coat was to be met, with Illustrious, Gloucester, York and Berwick detaching to attack Taranto, coincident with the Force X raid.

The Italians were aware of sorties from Alexandria and Gibraltar by 7 November and sent nine submarines to attack a Malta convoy (MW 3) detected on 8 November. Bombers (unsurprisingly) failed even to pinpoint the Judgement force and when Force H was detected headed back toward Gibraltar on 9 November, the Italians presumed MW 3 had turned around, too.

Italian confusion arose when Barham, Berwick, Glasgow and their destroyers were detected 10 November off Lemnos. The correct deduction, they had detached from the Gibraltar-bound force, was not accompanied by a correct guess they would join with Cunningham. The same day, Ramillies, Coventry and two destroyers protecting ME 3 were detected and again, bombers failed even to locate them.

The complexity of Operation MB8, with its various forces and convoys, deceived the Italians into thinking only normal convoying was underway. While Italian reconnaissance was characteristically bad, in the end, the Italians had only failed to keep track of Illustrious. That the Italians expected the British to behave in what was, at the time, their usual way was the root of the mistake.

See also
 Battle of the Mediterranean
 Malta Convoys
 Force H

Notes

References
 
 
 

Naval battles and operations of the European theatre of World War II
MB8
MB8
Naval aviation operations and battles
Conflicts in 1940
1940 in Italy
November 1940 events